Edvald Boasson Hagen (born 17 May 1987) is a Norwegian professional road racing cyclist, who rides for UCI ProTeam . He was ranked as no. 3 in the world by UCI as of 31 August 2009, when he was 22 years old. He is known as an all-rounder, having won the Norwegian National Road Race Championships in 2012, 2015 and 2016. He is also a ten-time winner of the Norwegian National Time Trial Championships.

Professional career

Maxbo–Bianchi (2006–07)
Boasson Hagen joined the Norwegian continental team  in 2006 and in his first season in the continental circuits he took eight wins including three stages of the Tour de l'Avenir.

In 2007 he enjoyed a successful season and scored fifteen wins, ending up second in number of victories behind ProTour sprinter Alessandro Petacchi. But, after the disqualification of the Italian in May 2008 for doping, Alessandro Petacchi lost 5 stage wins in the 2007 Giro resulting in Boasson Hagen having the most victories. Boasson Hagen won the overall classification as well as stages at Paris–Corrèze, Ringerike GP and Istrian Spring Trophy. He also took stages at Tour of Ireland, Tour de Normandie and Tour de Bretagne as well as the Norwegian time trial championship. As a result of these achievements, he finished fifth in the individual point standings of 2006-2007 UCI Europe Tour. In early 2007 it was announced that for 2008 season he would leave Team Maxbo Bianchi for the German UCI ProTeam . In late 2007 it was announced that Deutsche Telekom was to end sponsorship of T-Mobile Team with immediate effect. The team continued under the name Team High Road.

Team High Road (2008–09)

2008

Boasson Hagen began the 2008 season with a fifth place in the prologue of Tour of California, ahead of established time trial specialists like David Millar and Gustav Larsson. He later won the concluding individual time trial of Critérium International ahead of teammate Tony Martin and the Grand Prix de Denain. He also finished second at the Commerce Bank Reading Classic and became the Norway National Time Trial Champion for the second year in a row. Later in the year he competed in the Beijing Olympics Road Race, finishing 71st, and entered the ProTour race Eneco Tour aiming for the overall classification. He finished third in the prologue and was well placed in the following stages when in the fifth stage the front of the peloton split in the strong crosswinds and left him 14 minutes behind the leaders. Boasson Hagen lost any chance of overall victory but made up by winning the following stage in Brussels by passing Jimmy Engoulvent in the final fifteen meters of the race. At the Tour of Britain he won three stages and the points competition.

2009
In 2009, he won the cobbled classic Gent–Wevelgem in a two-man sprint against Liquigas rider Aleksandr Kuschynski. He also rode in the Giro d'Italia, his first ever Grand Tour, where Team Columbia won the Team Time trial, Boasson Hagen won the seventh stage in a sprint and finished second in the sixth and eighth stages. In the Tour de Pologne he won the fourth and sixth stages to finish third overall, and secure Norway ten riders in the upcoming UCI Road World Championships. Hagen also won his first stage race in 2009, the Eneco Tour, confirming his huge talent, and rising to third overall in the world ranking in August. Later in 2009 Boasson Hagen finished his season by winning four of the eight stages in the Tour of Britain, and winning the race overall. After months of rumours, it was official on 10 September 2009 that Boasson Hagen would be joining  from the 2010 season, along with fellow Norwegians Lars Petter Nordhaug and Kurt Asle Arvesen.

Team Sky (2010–14)

2010
After an impressive effort and stage win in the opening team time trial, Boasson Hagen secured 3rd and 6th-place finishes as his best results. In the Tour of Oman one week after the race in Qatar, Boasson Hagen won two stages, including the final stage in which he beat world time trial champion Fabian Cancellara by seventeen seconds in the individual time trial. With this win Boasson Hagen claimed second place in the overall classification, taking the young riders jersey and winning the overall points classification. Boasson Hagen won the seventh stage of the Critérium du Dauphiné. He also retained his national time trial title.

2011

In 2011, Boasson Hagen again finished second in the Tour of Oman, also winning the points jersey for the second year running. Boasson Hagen won the 1st stage of Bayern-Rundfahrt, and went on to win the points jersey, as well as helping team-mate Geraint Thomas win to first overall in the event. He won the Norwegian National Time Trial Championships for the fifth year running in June, but then contracted an illness that put his Tour de France in doubt.

He did recover though, and was given the go-ahead to ride the Tour. He won stage six of the Tour, the first ever victory by a British-registered professional cycling team in the Tour de France. Boasson Hagen finished second to compatriot Thor Hushovd on stage sixteen after the pair were in a three-man breakaway with Ryder Hesjedal. The next day he was again in a breakaway, and broke clear on the final climb of the day to take his second stage win of the Tour. Boasson Hagen finished second to Mark Cavendish on the final stage on the Champs Elysees.
In August, Boasson Hagen took a clean sweep of the jerseys at the Eneco Tour, winning the event overall, as well as the points and young riders competitions, and finishing first on the final stage.

2012

Boasson Hagen began the 2012 season with a second place to André Greipel in the Down Under Classic. After three top-five placings in stage finishes, he took the lead of the sprints classification after the fourth stage of the Tour Down Under and held the jersey until the end of the race. Boasson Hagen took the lead of the Volta ao Algarve after winning the second stage with a well-timed uphill sprint. He lost the race lead to team-mate Richie Porte on the next stage, after setting Porte up on the final climb, but he won the points jersey. He also won a stage of Tirreno–Adriatico, and acted as lead out man for Mark Cavendish. Boasson Hagen had a disappointing classics campaign, failing to post any major results. He did return to form at his home race, the Tour of Norway, winning the race overall, the points and young rider jerseys, and stage four which finished in his home town, Lillehammer.

In June 2012, Boasson Hagen won the Norwegian National Road Race Championships to take the national jersey for the first time; he did however lose his time trial national championship jersey to 's Reidar Borgersen. Boasson Hagen was selected in the Sky squad for the Tour de France. He finished fifth in the opening prologue in Liège, then took third on stage one, after bridging across to Peter Sagan and Cancellara in the closing stages, but being unable to beat them both in the sprint. He also finished second to Sagan on stage three, another hilltop finish.  At the end of August, Boasson Hagen took the victory in the one day World Tour race the GP Ouest-France. He broke away from the bunch with a little more than two kilometers to go, caught and dropped the remaining man in front, Rui Costa on the last uphill section and descended to the finish solo. He denied the sprinters in the eighty-man chasing group a chance at victory by holding on to a five-second advantage.

2013
Boasson Hagen began the season with the stated ambition of winning one of the Spring classics, but failed to attain any notable results. However, Boasson Hagen returned to defend his title at the Glava Tour of Norway. After finishing as runner-up in two of the previous sprint stages, Boasson Hagen sparked a two-man breakaway with Sérgio Paulinho to win the fourth stage and consequently both the overall and points classifications. Boasson Hagen would follow this up with a sprint victory on stage three of the Critérium du Dauphiné. He was also named in the startlist for the Tour de France that year but on stage 12 he broke his collarbone in a huge crash ten kilometers from the finish line and was forced to abandon the race.

2014
2014 was Boasson Hagen's worst year of his career in the fact that he did not record a single stage win. On 14 August, Boasson Hagen announced that he would leave  at the end of the 2014 season. On 27 August, Boasson Hagen announced that he would join African UCI Professional Continental Team  on a 2-year deal.

MTN–Qhubeka (2015–20)

2015
After finishing second overall of the Tour of Norway, Boasson Hagen picked up his first win in two years at the Tour des Fjords, on the last stage of the race. He outsprinted a small leading group of four riders to accomplish the feat. In June, Boasson Hagen won the Norwegian National Time Trial Championships and the Norwegian National Road Race Championships after jumping from the chasing group to join the lead group in the final kilometer. He won the title in a close sprint. In the final kilometers of the UCI Road World Championships, Boasson Hagen refused to cooperate with Greg van Avermaet to close the 10-second gap to later winner Peter Sagan. The most likely reason for Boasson Hagen not to put an effort in the chase was his fellow countryman and sprinter Alexander Kristoff who was in the main peloton just seconds behind the duo. Boasson Hagen eventually finished 20th, just 3 seconds behind the winner.

2016
Boasson Hagen enjoyed a return to form in the early part of the 2016 campaign; taking three stage victories at the Tour of Qatar and Tour of Oman, holding race leader jerseys in both races. He then ended up 5th in Paris-Roubaix after being a part of a five-man group that sprinted for the victory. In the late season, he was 6th at the World Championships in Qatar after not following orders from his team-mate Alexander Kristoff, who finished 7th in the sprint.

2017
Boasson Hagen soloed to victory on stage 19 of the Tour de France, successfully attacking from the breakaway in the final few kilometres. Boasson Hagen, along with Nikias Arndt, took the right side of a roundabout with only 2.2 kilometers remaining, whilst the remainder of the breakaway took the left. The right side of this roundabout ended up being shorter than the left and thus created a gap for the two cyclists. Boasson Hagen was then able to drop Arndt from his wheel to take the victory. This victory marked Boasson Hagen's only triumph at the 2017 Tour de France despite finishing on the podium 5 other times, on stages 7, 11, 14, 16 and 21.

2018
In January Boasson Hagen had his gallbladder removed. He started his season with an appearance at the Volta ao Algarve. In 2018 Boasson Hagen was shut out of world tour victories, only winning on stage 2 of the Tour of Norway and the Norwegian National Championships in the Individual Time Trial event.

2019
In 2019, Boasson Hagen was the only rider on Team Dimension Data's roster to take a victory in a World Tour race, winning stage 1 of the Critérium du Dauphiné.

2020
Participating in his 10th Tour de France, Boasson Hagen only achieved one top 10 finish in the race, finishing 2nd on Stage 7. Boasson Hagen also made headlines in the Tour of Flanders by attacking from the peloton right before a train arrived at a level crossing, holding up the peloton and allowing Boasson Hagen to continue.

Total Direct Énergie (2021–present)
He finished sixth at the Tour de Vendée, and took top-ten stage finishes at the Arctic Race of Norway and the Tour de Luxembourg. He extended his contract with the team, renamed  earlier in 2021, by a further two years. At the 2022 Tour de France, Boasson Hagen formed part of a successful breakaway on the fifth stage, finishing third on the stage to move up to third place in the general classification. He ultimately finished 58th overall, his best overall Tour de France finish for a decade.

Major results

2004
 National Junior Road Championships
1st  Road race
2nd Time trial
2005
 National Junior Road Championships
1st  Road race
1st  Time trial
 2nd Overall Junior Tour of Wales
 6th Time trial, UCI Juniors World Championships
2006
 1st Scandinavian Open Road Race
 Tour de l'Avenir
1st Stages 2, 5 & 7
 2nd Road race, National Road Championships
 2nd GP Aarhus
 3rd Overall Thüringen Rundfahrt der U23
1st Young rider classification
1st Stages 1 & 5
 5th Overall Ringerike GP
1st Stage 3
 8th Overall Rhône-Alpes Isère Tour
1st Points classification
1st Young rider classification
1st Stage 4
 9th Road race, UCI Under-23 Road World Championships
2007
 1st  Time trial, National Road Championships
 1st  Overall Istrian Spring Trophy
1st Prologue
 1st  Overall Paris–Corrèze
1st Points classification
1st Stages 1 & 2
 1st  Overall Ringerike GP
1st Young rider classification
1st Stages 1, 2, 3 & 5
 1st Stage 4 Tour of Ireland
 3rd Road race, National Under-23 Road Championships
 6th Time trial, UCI Under-23 Road World Championships
 6th Overall Tour de Bretagne
1st Stages 2 & 7
 7th Overall Tour de Normandie
1st Stage 8
 8th GP Herning
 9th Colliers Classic
2008
 1st  Time trial, National Road Championships
 1st Grand Prix de Denain
 Tour of Britain
1st  Sprints classification
1st Stages 4, 5 & 7
 1st Stage 3 (ITT) Critérium International
 1st Stage 6 Eneco Tour
 2nd Reading Classic
 5th Memorial Rik Van Steenbergen
2009
 1st  Time trial, National Road Championships
 1st  Overall Tour of Britain
1st  Points classification
1st Stages 3, 4, 5 & 6
 1st  Overall Eneco Tour
1st  Points classification
1st Stages 6 & 7 (ITT)
 1st Gent–Wevelgem
 Giro d'Italia
1st Stages 1 (TTT) & 7
 2nd Trofeo Sóller
 2nd Trofeo Calvia
 3rd Overall Tour de Pologne
1st Stages 4 & 6
 4th Monte Paschi Strade Bianche
 6th UCI World Ranking
 8th Trofeo Pollença
2010
 1st  Time trial, National Road Championships
 1st Dutch Food Valley Classic
 1st Stage 1 (TTT) Tour of Qatar
 1st Stage 7 Tirreno–Adriatico
 1st Stage 7 Critérium du Dauphiné
 2nd Overall Tour of Oman
1st  Points classification
1st  Young rider classification
1st Stages 3 & 6 (ITT)
 2nd Vattenfall Cyclassics
 2nd Grand Prix Cycliste de Québec
 2nd Chrono des Nations
 3rd Overall Eneco Tour
1st  Points classification
 6th Omloop Het Nieuwsblad
2011
 1st  Time trial, National Road Championships
 1st  Overall Eneco Tour
1st  Points classification
1st  Young rider classification
1st Stage 6
 1st Vattenfall Cyclassics
 Tour de France
1st Stages 6 & 17
 Bayern–Rundfahrt
1st  Points classification
1st Stage 1
 2nd Overall Tour of Oman
1st  Points classification
 8th Road race, UCI Road World Championships
 8th Kuurne–Brussels–Kuurne
2012
 National Road Championships
1st  Road race
2nd Time trial
 1st  Overall Tour of Norway
1st  Points classification
1st  Young rider classification
1st Stage 4
 1st GP Ouest–France
 Volta ao Algarve
1st  Points classification
1st Stage 2
 1st Stage 3 Tirreno–Adriatico
 1st Stage 3 Critérium du Dauphiné
 2nd  Road race, UCI Road World Championships
 3rd Overall Tour of Beijing
1st  Points classification
 5th Trofeo Migjorn
 5th Gent–Wevelgem
 5th Vattenfall Cyclassics
 5th Grand Prix Cycliste de Montréal
 7th Overall Tour Down Under
1st  Sprints classification
2013
 National Road Championships
1st  Time trial
3rd Road race
 1st  Overall Tour of Norway
1st  Points classification
1st Stage 4
 1st Stage 3 Critérium du Dauphiné
 3rd  Team time trial, UCI Road World Championships
 5th Down Under Classic
 8th Overall Tour of Qatar
 9th E3 Harelbeke
2014
 2nd Trofeo Serra de Tramuntana
 2nd Japan Cup
 3rd Omloop Het Nieuwsblad
 6th Trofeo Muro-Port d'Alcúdia
2015
 National Road Championships
1st  Road race
1st  Time trial
 1st  Overall Tour of Britain
 2nd Overall Tour of Norway
 4th Overall Arctic Race of Norway
 6th Overall Danmark Rundt
1st Stage 2
 7th Overall Tour des Fjords
1st Stage 5
 10th Milan–San Remo
2016
 National Road Championships
1st  Road race
1st  Time trial
 Critérium du Dauphiné
1st  Points classification
1st Stage 4
 1st Stage 7 Eneco Tour
 2nd Overall Tour of Norway
1st Stages 4 & 5
 3rd Trofeo Felanitx-Ses Salines-Campos-Porreres
 5th Overall Tour of Qatar
1st Stage 3 (ITT)
 5th Paris–Roubaix
 6th Road race, UCI Road World Championships
 6th Overall Tour of Oman
1st  Points classification
1st Stages 2 & 5
 10th Bretagne Classic
2017
 1st  Time trial, National Road Championships
 1st  Overall Tour des Fjords
1st  Points classification
1st Stages 3, 4 & 5
 1st  Overall Tour of Norway
1st  Points classification
1st Stages 1 & 5
 1st Stage 19 Tour de France
 2nd Overall Tour of Britain
1st Stage 8
 7th Time trial, UEC European Road Championships
 7th Bretagne Classic
2018
 1st  Time trial, National Road Championships
 3rd Overall Tour of Norway
1st Stage 2
 4th Overall Tour des Fjords
 4th Dwars door Vlaanderen
 8th Eschborn–Frankfurt
 10th Grand Prix Cycliste de Montréal
2019
 1st Stage 1 Critérium du Dauphiné
 3rd Time trial, National Road Championships
 3rd Overall Tour of Norway
1st Stage 3
 9th Overall Volta a la Comunitat Valenciana
1st Stage 1 (ITT)
2020
 9th Grand Prix La Marseillaise
2021
 6th Tour de Vendée
2022
 3rd Road race, National Road Championships
 4th Grand Prix La Marseillaise
 7th Paris–Camembert
2023
 3rd Clàssica Comunitat Valenciana 1969
 4th Grand Prix de Denain

Classics results timeline

Grand Tour general classification results timeline

References

External links

 
  

1987 births
Living people
Norwegian male cyclists
Norwegian Tour de France stage winners
Cyclists at the 2008 Summer Olympics
Cyclists at the 2012 Summer Olympics
Cyclists at the 2016 Summer Olympics
Olympic cyclists of Norway
Norwegian Giro d'Italia stage winners
Sportspeople from Lillehammer
2011 Tour de France stage winners